Zorilispiella rufipennis is a species of beetle in the family Cerambycidae, and the only species in the genus Zorilispiella. It was described by Pic in 1926.

References

Apomecynini
Beetles described in 1926
Monotypic beetle genera